The 2011–12 South Carolina Gamecocks men's basketball team represented the University of South Carolina in the sport of basketball during the 2011–12 NCAA Division I men's basketball season. The Gamecocks competed in the Eastern Division of the Southeastern Conference (SEC). They played their home games in the Colonial Life Arena on the university's Columbia, South Carolina campus.

On March 13, 2012, head coach Darrin Horn was fired after four seasons with the Gamecocks. Horn compiled a 60–63 overall record and a 23–45 SEC record during his tenure.

Previous season
The Gamecocks finished the 2010–11 season 14–16 overall, 2–14 in SEC play and lost in the first round of the SEC tournament to Ole Miss.

Roster

Schedule

|-
!colspan=9| Exhibition

|-
!colspan=9| Regular season

|-
!colspan=9| SEC Regular Season

|-
!colspan=9| 2012 SEC tournament

References

South Carolina
South Carolina Gamecocks men's basketball seasons
South Carolina Gamecocks men's basketball
South Carolina Gamecocks men's basketball